Aleksandr Anatolyevich Kolotilko (born 11 July 1979) is a Russian former professional footballer.

Club career
He made his Russian Football National League debut for FC Neftekhimik Nizhnekamsk on 23 May 1997 in a game against FC Anzhi Makhachkala. He played 6 seasons in the FNL for Neftekhimik and Anzhi.

External links
 

1979 births
Living people
Russian footballers
Russia under-21 international footballers
Association football forwards
R.W.D. Molenbeek players
R. Charleroi S.C. players
FC Anzhi Makhachkala players
FC Neftekhimik Nizhnekamsk players
Belgian Pro League players
Challenger Pro League players
Russian expatriate footballers
Expatriate footballers in France
Expatriate footballers in Belgium
People from Nizhnekamsk
Sportspeople from Tatarstan